"Fresh Azimiz" ("fresh as I'm is") is a single featured on rapper Bow Wow's 2005 album Wanted. It is the third song after his singles "Let Me Hold You" with singer Omarion and "Like You" with Ciara. It features J-Kwon & Jermaine Dupri. The song was produced by Jermaine Dupri. The song became his third Top 40 single from his 2005 album Wanted, peaking at number 23 on the Billboard Hot 100.

Although released through Columbia Records, the lyrics on the 2nd verse of the original song explains that Bow Wow still has close ties to So So Def Recordings ("Records say Columbia, but I'm So So man").

Rumored diss to Romeo
Rumors circulated that the song was meant to attack rapper Lil' Romeo, with the line, "18 nigga, making more than your Dad." The line in question is actually borrowed from LL Cool J's song, "The Do Wop" on the classic album Bigger and Deffer. Bow Wow later confirmed that the line was not aimed at Miller's father,  Master P or  Miller himself. Because of that, Romeo dedicated the song of God's Gift entitled "U Can't Shine Like Me" with the line "You a Mama's boy I'm a son of a hustler".

Live performance
On April 1, 2006, Bow Wow performed "Fresh Azimiz" at the 2006 Kids' Choice Awards as part of a musical duel with singer Chris Brown that was inspired by the 1986 Run-D.M.C. music video "Walk This Way".

Remix
A remix of this song features rapper Mike Jones, replacing Bow Wow's 2nd verse. There is a video for the remix, with additional scenes with Bow Wow & Jones throughout the video and Bow Wow's verse removed and Mike Jones' instead comes in and raps. Jones also makes an appearance on the original version's video.

Charts

Weekly charts

Year-end charts

References

External links
 
 

2005 songs
2005 singles
2006 singles
Bow Wow (rapper) songs
Jermaine Dupri songs
J-Kwon songs
Mike Jones (rapper) songs
Song recordings produced by Jermaine Dupri
Songs written by Jermaine Dupri